USS General Putnam is a name used more than once by the U.S. Navy:

 , a Civil War tugboat and gunboat
 , a ferry boat acquired under charter by the Navy 6 February 1918

United States Navy ship names